Hyalarctia bertrandi is a moth of the family Erebidae first described by Hervé de Toulgoët in 2000. It is found in Brazil.

References

Phaegopterina
Moths described in 2000